The  is a Japanese railway line in Akita Prefecture in northern Japan, with all station located within the city of Yurihonjō.

History

The JGR became the Japanese National Railways (JNR) after World War II. All scheduled freight services were discontinued from March 10, 1981. On October 10, 1985, the operations of the former Yashima line were taken over by the newly created third sector (in Japanese sense) Yuri Kōgen Railroad.

Proposed connecting line
  Maego station - The Yokote Railway Co. opened a 38 km line from Yokote on the Ou Main Line to Oikata between 1918 and 1930. Construction commenced on an extension to this station but it was not completed. The 12 km section from Oikata - Niiyama was closed following typhoon damage in 1947, the 7 km section from Niiyama - Tateai closed in 1965 when a bridge was destroyed by floodwaters, and the balance of the line closed in 1971.

Basic data
Distance: 23.0 km (14.3 mi)
Gauge: 
Stations: 12
Track: Entire line single tracked
Power: Internal combustion (Diesel)
Railway signalling
Ugo-Honjō — Maegō: Staff token
Maegō — Yashima: Tablet token

Stations

Rolling stock
As of August 2020, the line operates the following diesel multiple units (DMUs):

 YR-2000 (total 2 cars)
 YR-3000 (total 3 cars)

Former rolling stock
 YR-1000/YR-1500 (total 5 cars)

See also
List of railway companies in Japan
List of railway lines in Japan

References

This article incorporates material from the corresponding article in the Japanese Wikipedia

External links 
 Yuri Kōgen Railway official website

Railway lines in Japan
Rail transport in Akita Prefecture
Railway lines opened in 1922
1067 mm gauge railways in Japan
Companies based in Akita Prefecture
Japanese third-sector railway lines